Enzo Lettieri (born 19 July 1998) is an Argentine professional footballer who plays as a defender for Nueva Chicago.

Career
After a nine-year stint in the youth of Independiente de Monte, Lettieri joined Nueva Chicago's academy in 2015. A 2–0 defeat at the Estadio La Ciudadela to San Martín on 28 July 2017 in Primera B Nacional saw Lettieri make his professional debut, with the defender starting and finishing the fixture under manager Facundo Argüello.

Career statistics
.

References

External links

1998 births
Living people
Sportspeople from Buenos Aires Province
Argentine footballers
Association football defenders
Primera Nacional players
Nueva Chicago footballers